A partisan is a committed member of a political party. In multi-party systems, the term is used for persons who strongly support their party's policies and are reluctant to compromise with political opponents.

United States

The term's meaning has changed dramatically over the last 60 years in the United States. Before the American National Election Study (described in Angus Campbell et al., in The American Voter) began in 1952, an individual's partisan tendencies were typically determined by their voting behaviour. Since then, "partisan" has come to refer to an individual with a psychological identification with one or the other of the major parties. Depending on their political beliefs, candidates may join a party. As they build the framework for career advancement, parties are more often than not the preferred choice for candidates. There are many parties in a system, and candidates often join them instead of standing as an Independent if that is provided for.

In the U.S., politicians have generally been identified with a party. Many local elections in the U.S. (as for mayor) are "nonpartisan." A candidate may have a party affiliation but it is not listed on the ballot. Independents occasionally appear in significant contests but rarely win. At the presidential level, the best independent vote getters were Ross Perot in 1992 and 1996, and John B. Anderson in 1980.

President Dwight D. Eisenhower was nonpartisan until 1952, when he joined the Republican Party and was elected president. According to David A. Crockett, "Much of Eisenhower's nonpartisan image was genuine, for he found Truman's campaigning distasteful and inappropriate, and he disliked the partisan aspects of campaigning." With little interest in routine partisanship, Eisenhower left much of the building and sustaining of the Republican Party to his vice president, Richard Nixon. With Eisenhower uninvolved in party building, Nixon became the de facto national GOP leader."

Eisenhower's largely nonpartisan stance allowed him to work smoothly with the Democratic leader's Speaker Sam Rayburn in the House and Majority Leader Lyndon Johnson in the Senate. Jean Smith says:
Ike, LBJ, and "Mr. Sam" did not trust one another completely and they did not see eye to eye on every issue, but they understood one another and had no difficulty working together. Eisenhower continued to meet regularly with the Republican leadership. But his weekly sessions with Rayburn and Johnson, usually in the evening, over drinks, were far more productive. For Johnson and Rayburn, it was shrewd politics to cooperate with Ike. Eisenhower was wildly popular in the country. ... By supporting a Republican president against the Old Guard of his own party, the Democrats hoped to share Ike's popularity.

Marxism–Leninism

Partiinost' is a transliteration of the Russian term партийность originated in Marxism–Leninism. In Chinese, it is translated as Dangxing. It can be variously translated as party-mindedness, partisanship, or party spirit. The term can refer to both a philosophical position concerning the sociology of knowledge and an official doctrine of public intellectual life in the Soviet Union. The term may also mean the membership of a person in a certain political party.

The term was coined by Vladimir Lenin in 1895, responding to Peter Struve, to counter what he considered to be the futility of objectivity in political, economic analysis. Class interests and material conditions of existence determine ideology, and thus, in a Marxist-Leninist view, true objectivity (in terms of non-partisanship) is not possible in a society of antagonistic classes.  Marxists, in Lenin's view, should openly acknowledge their partisanship on the side of proletarian revolution.  Bourgeois emphasis on the normative goal of objectivity is thus considered delusional.  In this sense, partiinost is a universal and inevitable element of political and ideological life. Still, its presence is not always acknowledged or flatly denied by the ruling class.

Descriptively, partiinost''' was not a novel concept and had been described in different words by Thrasymachus, Xenophanes, and Karl Marx.  However, Lenin's term has a normative element that was not present in prior descriptions of the phenomenon.  In other words, Lenin insisted that partiinost' should be publicly expressed whenever possible.

A clear expression of partiinost can be found in its entry in the Great Soviet Encyclopedia:
<blockquote>The Communist Party consistently upholds the principle of partiinost'.  Defending and substantiating the goals and tasks of the working class and the policies of the Communist Party, Marxist-Leninist theory mercilessly criticizes the exploiters' system, its politics, and its ideology.  ... By contrast, the bourgeoisie, whose interests conflict with those of the majority, is forced to hide its self-seeking aspirations, to pretend that its economic and political aims are those of society as a whole, and to wrap itself in the toga of non-partisanship</blockquote>Partiinost' is also used by Lenin in Materialism and Empirio-criticism'' to refer to the concept of philosophical factionalism, which he defined broadly as the struggle between idealists and materialists.

Research
Partisanship causes survey respondents to answer political surveys differently, even if the survey asks a question with an objective answer. People with strong partisan beliefs are 12% more likely to give an incorrect answer that benefits their preferred party than an incorrect answer that benefits another party. This is due to the phenomenon of motivated reasoning, of which there are several types, including "cheerleading" and congenial inference. Motivated reasoning means that a partisan survey respondent may feel motivated to answer the survey in a way that they know is incorrect; when the respondent is uncertain of an answer, partisanship may also motivate them to guess or predict an answer that favorable to their party. Studies have found that offering a cash incentive for correct answers reduces partisan bias in responses by about 50%, from 12–15% to about 6%.

See also

 Bipartisanship
 Macropartisanship
 Negative partisanship
 Nonpartisan
 Partisan (disambiguation)
 Political faction
 Political polarization
 Sectarianism

Notes

External links

 Graphic showing Rise of Partisanship in the US House of Representatives 1949–2011
 Do politics make us irrational? – a TED-Ed talk by Jay Van Bavel

Political terminology of the United States
Soviet phraseology
Political parties